Tetagunta is one of the villages in Tuni Mandal in Kakinada district in Andhra Pradesh State and is located 14.1 km from its Mandal main town Tuni. It is 44.3 km from its district main city Kakinada. It has a population of 11,967 and people mostly depend on farming. Tetagunta village of Tuni Mandal is having the largest area of 4,033 hectares in the East Godavari District.It is located at a distance of 120 km from the state main city Visakhapatnam.
Pincode:533406

History
Tetagunta surrounded by the Eastern Ghats has some prehistorical evidences along with some traces of Early Jain rock beds.

Localities near Tetagunta 

Nearby villages of this village with distance are Srungadhara Agraharam (3.6 km.), R.B.Kothuru (4.3 km.), Chepuru (5.1 km.), Parupaka (5.5 km.), Gidajam (6 km.). Nearest Towns are Thondangi (7 km.), Sankhavaram (7.4 km.), Routhulapudi (9.4 km.), Tuni (14.1 km.),

D.Polavaram, Dondavaka, K.O.Mallavaram, Kolimeru, Kothuru, and Kummarilova are the villages along with this village in the same Tuni Mandal.

Transport
There are regular buses towards kakinada, Rajamundry, Routulapudi, Janrdhanapatnam which are run buy the A.P.S.R.T.C a government owned organization. NH5 passes through this village serves nearby villages to sell their goods by Roadway. The nearest railway station is Timmapuram railway station   where there are regular passenger trains towards, Visakhapatnam, Rajamundry, Kakinada, Vijayawada. For longer distances the nearest railway station is Tuni which has Express services.

Education

Schools nearby Tetagunta:-

1. ZP HIGH SCHOOL, Tetagunta

2. S.C.S.R.MPL.HIGH SCHOOL, 21st WARD, Tetagunta

Colleges nearby Tetagunta:-

1. Spaces Degree College
Address : pl puram; NH—5 ; tuni—533401; e.g.dist..

2. Siddhartha Degree College
Address : durgadas street; tuni—533401; e.g.dist..

3. GOVT JUNIOR COLLEGE (GIRLS) TUNI

4. Sri Satya Sai Vidya Vihar, Annavaram

Local Temples

1. Lord Shiva Temple

2. Lord Nukalamma Temple (Grama Devata)

3. Lord Kanaka Durga Temple

4. Lord Vinayaka Temple

5. Lord Sri Rama Temple

6. Lord Krishna Temple

7. Lord Adavi Rajulu Temple

8. Lord Sai Baba Temple

Tourism

Nearby Tourist Places:-

Tetagunta  	Lord Shiva "UMAMAHESHWARA TEMPLE" it is famous temple

Kakinada  	45 km near

Rajamundry  	86 km near

Konaseema  	97 km near

Visakhapatnam  	119 km near

Papi Kondalu  	112 km near

Annavaram      5 km near

Talupulamma Lova  15.8 km near

Districts
Nearby Districts:-

East Godavari district  	50 km near

Visakhapatnam district  107 km near

Vizianagaram district 	154 km near

Banks
1)CANARA BANK

IFSC Code: CNRB0003750 

Address: CANARA BANK, DR NO 4-6 KOMATI STREET, TUNI MANDAL, TETAGUNTA, 533406, East Godavari district, ANDHRA PRADESH.

References

 Pre-historic habitations found in EG

 SaiBaba Temple

 Lord Shiva Temple

 Nookalamma temple

 Durga Devi Temple

Specific

Villages in Kakinada district